In information theory, the entropy power inequality (EPI) is a result that relates to so-called "entropy power" of random variables. It shows that the entropy power of suitably well-behaved random variables is a superadditive function. The entropy power inequality was proved in 1948 by Claude Shannon in his seminal paper "A Mathematical Theory of Communication". Shannon also provided a sufficient condition for equality to hold; Stam (1959) showed that the condition is in fact necessary.

Statement of the inequality

For a random vector X : Ω → Rn with probability density function f : Rn → R, the differential entropy of X, denoted h(X), is defined to be

and the entropy power of X, denoted N(X), is defined to be

In particular, N(X) = |K| 1/n when X is normal distributed with covariance matrix K.

Let X and Y be independent random variables with probability density functions in the Lp space Lp(Rn) for some p > 1. Then

Moreover, equality holds if and only if X and Y are multivariate normal random variables with proportional covariance matrices.

Alternative form of the inequality

The entropy power inequality can be rewritten in an equivalent form that does not explicitly depend on the definition of entropy power (see Costa and Cover reference below).

Let X and Y be independent random variables, as above.  Then, let X' and Y' be independently distributed random variables with gaussian distributions, such that

 and 

Then,

See also
Information entropy
Information theory
Limiting density of discrete points
Self-information
Kullback–Leibler divergence
Entropy estimation

References

 
 
 
 
 

Information theory
Probabilistic inequalities
Statistical inequalities